Krishna Bhabini Nari Siksha Mandir is a well-known girls school in Chandannagar, West Bengal, India. It was established in 1926 by Harihar Sett in the name of his mother Krishnabhabini Das. In Hooghly district at Chandannagar area this was the first girl's high school. It is affiliated to WBBSE, WBCHSE. There was an arrangement hostel facility for students. It was one of the oldest educational institution in the area.

See also
Education in India
List of schools in India
Education in West Bengal

References

External links
 

High schools and secondary schools in West Bengal
Girls' schools in West Bengal
Schools in Hooghly district
Chandannagar
Educational institutions established in 1926
1926 establishments in India